Carlo Antonio Bertinazzi (2 December 1710, in Turin – 6 September 1783), known as Carlin, was an Italian actor and author. He is known to have traveled with Giacomo Casanova's mother, Zanetta Farussi, to St Petersburg to perform for Empress Anna of Russia, only to return to Italy shortly after, as the empress did not approve of the comedy. 

Carlin was best known for his role as Harlequin in the commedia dell'arte (Italian comedy) that he performed from 1741 until his death.

External links
 Biography in French
 Carlin in Harlequin costume
 Profile, oxfordreference.com; accessed 16 December 2015.

References

1710 births
1783 deaths
Actors from Turin
Place of death missing
18th-century Italian male actors
Italian male stage actors
18th-century Italian writers
18th-century Italian male writers
Writers from Turin